This article is a list of countries by forest area.

Planet, continents and regions 
All areas are given in units of 1000 hectares. Source: Food and Agriculture Organization

Countries and territories 
All areas are given in units of 1000 hectares. Source: Food and Agriculture Organization of the United Nations

See also 

Deforestation by continent
Forest cover by state and territory in the United States
Forest cover by state in India
Forest cover by federal subject in Russia
Forest cover by province or territory in Canada
Forest cover by state or territory in Australia
Forest Landscape Integrity Index
Forest restoration
List of countries by forest area (percentage)
Reforestation

Sources 
This article incorporates text from  Licensed under CC BY-SA 3.0. See c:File:Global Forest Resources Assessment 2020 – Key findings.pdf. .

References

External links 
 Global Forest Resources Assessment at FAO
 Forest data at FAO

Forestry by country
Forestry-related lists
Forests by country
Geography-related lists
Lists by area
Lists of countries by geography
Lists of forests
World forestry